Discovering the Waterfront is the second studio album by Canadian post-hardcore band Silverstein.  The album was promoted with three music videos for the tracks "Smile in Your Sleep", "Discovering the Waterfront", and "My Heroine".

Recording
Discovering the Waterfront was recorded at Capitol Studios in Hollywood, California, and Maple Sound Studios in Santa Ana, California, between March and April 2005 with producer Cameron Webb. Webb also engineered and mixed the album.

Release
On April 13, 2005, Discovering the Waterfront was announced for release in four months' time. In April and May 2005, the group performed across the US as part of the Fueled By Ramen & Friends Tour, and appeared at The Bamboozle festival.  Following this, they toured Europe with the Black Maria and Aiden, and Australia with Behind Crimson Eyes until the end of May 2005. The album's track listing was posted online on May 25, 2005. They toured across Canada with Spitalfield, Sleepersetsail and the Turn It Ups, which included an appearance at Exo Fest, and then toured the US on the Warped Tour between mid-June and mid-August. "Smile in Your Sleep" was released as a radio single on July 19. Discovering the Waterfront was released on August 16 through Victory Records; it was promoted with a two-week US tour with I Am the Avalanche, Scary Kids Scaring Kids and Evergreen Terrace. Following this, they appeared at a Victory Records showcase at the CMJ Music Marathon, and played a handful of East Coast US shows with Underoath, Sincebyman, and Sullivan. In October 2005, the band toured the UK with labelmates Hawthorne Heights, Bayside and Spitalfield; it lead into a two-month tour of the US with those same acts, plus Aiden, dubbed the Never Sleep Again Tour.

In February 2006, the band went on a short headlining tour in the US, with support from Spitalfield, the Audition, and Stretch Arm Strong. On February 28, 2006, a music video was released for "Discovering the Waterfront". The band went on the Take Action Tour in March, and the Taste of Chaos tour in April, leading up to appearances at The Bamboozle and Groezrock festivals. The band went on the 2006 edition of the Warped Tour. In August, the band made an appearance at Dirt Fest. The album was reissued on September 19 with a DVD and the bonus track "Rodeo Clown". In September, the band supported Underoath on their tour of Canada. In October and November, the band went on a headlining tour of the US, dubbed the Never Shave Again Tour, with support from Aiden, It Dies Today, He Is Legend, Man Alive, the Blackout Pact and I Killed the Prom Queen.

Reception

Critical reception
Discovering the Waterfront received generally mixed to positive reviews. Rick Anderson of Allmusic gave the album 4 stars out of 5 and commented on how the album sounded "remarkably mature [...] for a band that has only been together for a few years." Drowned in Sound reviewer Brian E. Jemimah panned the album and said that the album sounded exactly the same as When Broken Is Easily Fixed (2003). He wrote: "There is some unremarkable, bog-standard drumming – always the necessary spine of a shit band – and some over-nurtured songs that have so many catchy soaring choruses (peppered with screamo ‘moments’) for The Kids to sing along to that it can be nothing but dull. Add some disgustingly tacked-on strings half the way through and you have  than enough reasons to press eject."

Commercial performance
Discovering the Waterfront charted at number 34 on the Billboard 200 chart and number 3 on the Independent Albums chart. It also landed at number 42 on the Billboard Independent Albums Year-end chart. By the end of 2005, the album had sold over 100,000 copies in the US. By August 2006, the album had sold over 188,000 copies. As of June 2007, the album has sold 232,000 copies. On the album's 10th anniversary the band posted a photo that mentioned the album had sold 400,000 copies.

Legacy
In honor of its tenth anniversary, Silverstein embarked on a Discovering the Waterfront tour beginning on 15 January 2015. It is a worldwide tour, consisting of US/Canada, Europe, UK and Australia.

Track listing
All songs written by Neil Boshart and Shane Told, except where noted. All songs performed by Silverstein.

Personnel
Personnel per booklet.

Silverstein
Shane Told – vocals
Paul Koehler – drums
Neil Boshart – guitar
Josh Bradford – guitar
Billy Hamilton – bass guitar

Additional musicians
Sean Mackin – string arrangement, violin
Rodney Wirtz – violin, viola, cello
Curtis Mathewson – mellotron, synths on "My Heroine"
Shane Told – guitars on "Fist Wrapped in Blood", "My Heroine" and "Call It Karma"
Billy Hamilton – additional vocals on "Smile in Your Sleep", "Discovering the Waterfront", "Defend You" and "Three Hours Back"
Silverstein, Gohan and Chris, Julia, Cameron Webb, Nick Over It and his buddy Ryan – group vocals

Production
Cameron Webb – producer, engineer, mixing
Sergio Chavez, Steve Genewick, David Fricks – additional engineering
Scott Komer, Cory Gash – pre-production recording
Brian Gardner – mastering
Mike Fasano – drum tech
Paul Koehler, Silverstein – art direction
Martin Wittfooth – artwork
Gordie Ball – photo
Doublej – layout

Chart positions

Peak positions

Year-end charts

References
 Footnotes

 Citations

External links

Discovering the Waterfront at YouTube (streamed copy where licensed)

Silverstein (band) albums
2005 albums
Victory Records albums
Albums recorded at Capitol Studios